Hammett is an unincorporated community in Crawford County, in the U.S. state of Georgia.

History
A post office called Hammett was established in 1904, and remained in operation until 1940. The community was named after the Hammett brothers, proprietors of a local sawmill.

References

Unincorporated communities in Crawford County, Georgia